The 1871 Victorian football season was an Australian rules football competition played during the winter of 1871. The season consisted of matches between football clubs in the colony of Victoria. The Carlton Football Club was the premier club for the season.

1871 season 

Four clubs participated in senior football during the 1870 season: Albert-park,  and South Yarra. Hobson's Bay Railway folded at the conclusion of the 1870 season.

The formal practice of senior clubs playing matches at odds against junior clubs was established during the season. In matches played at odds, the senior team fielded fifteen players and the junior team fielded twenty players. Matches played at odds were quite competitive: the premier club Carlton was unbeaten at even strength against senior clubs, but lost two of five matches played at odds. Three metropolitan junior clubs – Collingwood, Richmond and Carlton United – played against the senior clubs during the year.

During the 1871 season, the senior clubs competed in specific matches for the Challenge Cup; and, separately, a premier team was selected based on all matches during the season, including Challenge Cup matches.

Challenge Cup 

The Challenge Cup which South Yarra had put up for contest at the start of the 1870 season was returned by Albert-park to South Yarra at the end of the year, following the dispute over whether or not Albert-park had formally won it.

South Yarra opted to put the trophy up for contest again in 1871. Albert-park declined to contest it, although it continued to play senior games against the other clubs. The remaining clubs – Carlton, Melbourne and South Yarra – decided that each club would play the others three times during the season, and the top two would play a single playoff match for the Cup.

This meant that the Cup was being contested in a league-type competition, and by traditional definitions was no longer a Challenge Cup with a perpetual holder. 

Two of the three Carlton-Melbourne matches were postponed by four weeks due to rain, while the two unplayed Carlton-South Yarra matches were scratched as they would have had no effect on the outcome.

|-
| Saturday, 7 October 1871 (3:00 pm)
| align= center| 
| align= center| def.
| align= center| 
| style="font-size: 100%"| Emerald Hill Ground
| 
|-
|
| align=center| 22
| align=center| HalfFinal
| align=center| 00
| valign=top style="font-size: 85%" colspan=2 | 
|-
|
| align=center valign=top style="font-size: 85%" | Clarke, Dedman
| align=center valign=top | Goals
| valign=top style="font-size: 85%"|
|-

With this victory in the Grand Final (the first of its kind in elite Australian rules football history), Carlton claimed undisputed and permanent ownership of the South Yarra Challenge Cup, and also won the 1871 premiership.

Premiership 
In addition to winning the Challenge Cup, Carlton was adjudged premiers for the season, and Melbourne were runners-up.

The two clubs were the dominant senior clubs in the colony, and the premiership was mostly determined based on the win–loss record in matches between the two: their four matches, including the Challenge Cup Grand Final, yielded one win for Carlton and three draws, though the third draw was disputed (claimed as a win by Melbourne and as a draw by Carlton).

Albert-park was third: while they lost their matches against Carlton and Melbourne, they beat South Yarra (who had been winless since 1868 in senior matches) twice during the year.

Carlton's and Melbourne's overall records as reported at each club's Annual General Meeting in 1872 (reporting different results for the disputed match between the teams) are given below. The Senior results include the Challenge Cup playoff match, and matches Carlton and Melbourne played against Geelong.

External links 
 History of Australian rules football in Victoria (1853-1900)

References 

Australian rules football competition seasons
1871 in sports
1871 in Australian rules football